Common names: Black shield tail snake
Melanophidium is a genus of nonvenomous shield tail snakes endemic to the Western Ghats of India. These species are identifiable by having a mental groove in their chin shields. Currently, four species are recognized, including one newly described species.

Natural history
Their very smooth and glossy skin is said to be highly iridescent and is functional in warding off debris during burrowing. They are typically fossorial and nocturnal, becoming active during rainy nights.

Geographic range
Found in India in the Western Ghats: from Tirunelveli Hills in Tamil Nadu, at the southern tip of the country, northwards up to the Amboli Hills in Maharashtra.

Species

T) Type species

References

External links

 

Uropeltidae
Snake genera
Taxa named by Albert Günther